The Two Orphans (French:Les Deux orphelines) is a historical play by the French writers Adolphe d'Ennery and Eugène Cormon. It premiered on 20 January 1874 at the Théâtre de la Porte Saint-Martin in Paris. A melodrama set during the French Revolution, it takes place in five acts.

In the United States

The play as translated by N. Hart Jackson into English debuted in the United States at A.M. Palmer's Union Square Theatre on December 21, 1874, played for 180 performances, and eventually proved to be one of the most performed melodramas in the country for the next few decades.  Odell's Annals of the New York Stage called it "one of the greatest theatrical successes of all time in America."  Kate Claxton made her career in the role of Louise, and she later purchased the performance rights to the play and played it widely for years.Fisher, James. Historical Dictionary of American Theater: Beginnings, p. 436 (2015)  It was also the play being performed during the December 1876 Brooklyn Theatre fire that killed at least 278 people.

The play was revived on Broadway in 1904 (56 performances) and 1926 (32 performances).  It was also adapted to film at least four times during the silent film era starting in 1908.

Original 1874 Broadway cast
 Kate Claxton as Louise
 Kitty Blanchard as Henriette
 Rose Eytinge as Marianne
 Charles R. Thorne Jr. as Chevalier DeVaudry
 Ida Vernon as Sister Genevieve
 Marie Wilkins as La Frochard

Adaptations

The play has been turned into many other works including an 1877 novel written by the same authors, an 1878 Portuguese opera, D.W. Griffith's 1921 film Orphans of the Storm, and numerous other films.

References

 Klossner, Michael. The Europe of 1500-1815 on Film and Television. McFarland, 2002.

External links

1874 plays
French plays adapted into films
Plays set in France
Plays set in the 18th century
Plays set in the French Revolution
Orphans in fiction